Richardson Bluff is a steep rock bluff which rises on the east side of Kirkby Glacier opposite Frecker Ridge, in the Anare Mountains, Victoria Land. Named by ANARE (Australian National Antarctic Research Expeditions) for Sgt. Alan K. Richardson, RAAF, member of the RAAF Antarctic Flight which accompanied the ANARE (Thala Dan) cruise to this coast, 1962.

References

Cliffs of Victoria Land
Pennell Coast